The fourth season of the American reality competition streaming series The Circle premiered on Netflix on May 4, 2022. Michelle Buteau returned as host; the season consists of 13 episodes, initially released four episodes weekly. Players compete without ever actually meeting in person; they communicate through a simulated social media interface, portraying themselves in any way they choose.

Frank Grimsley, who had played the game as himself, won the US$150,000 prize on May 25, 2022. His win cemented him as the first LGBT winner. Trevor St. Agathe as "Imani" was the runner-up. Josh "Bru" Brubaker won the Fan Favorite award and US$10,000.

Format 

The contestants, or "players", move into the same apartment building. However, the contestants do not meet face-to-face during the course of the competition, as they each live in their own individual apartment. They communicate solely using their profiles on a specially-designed social media app that gives them the ability to portray themselves in any way they choose. Players can thus opt to present themselves as a completely different personality to the other players, a tactic otherwise known as catfishing.

Throughout the series, the contestants "rate" one another from first to last place. At the end of the ratings, their average ratings are revealed to one another from lowest to highest. Normally, the two highest-rated players become "Influencers", while the remaining players will be at risk of being "blocked" by the Influencers. However, occasionally there may be a twist to the blocking process – varying from the lowest rating players being instantly blocked, the identity of the Influencers being a secret, or multiple players being blocked at one time. Blocked players are eliminated from the game, but are given the opportunity to meet one player still in the game in-person. Then, the day after a blocking, a video message is shown to the remaining players to reveal if they were real or fake.

Also, fans of The Circle are able to vote for their favorite player. The player that receives the most votes is known as the Fan Favorite and receives .

Production

Development and release 
The season was announced on August 9, 2021 when Netflix renewed The Circle for a fourth and fifth season prior the premiere of the third season. The season premiered on May 4, with four episodes releasing weekly until May 25.

A teaser for the season was released on April 27, 2022 showing bits of the cast and revealing that the prize money had been increased to $150,000 rather than the $100,000 prize awarded during previous seasons due to Spice Girls members Emma Bunton and Mel B increasing the prize fund by completing a mission while partaking in the season. During the trailer, it was also confirmed that previous host Michelle Buteau will continue to host the series.

Casting and filming 
Filming for the season took place in Fall 2021 at an apartment complex in Manchester, England. The same complex that was used during previous seasons and other versions of the series. The apartment complex is prepared with twelve furnished and ready-to-use apartments for the players to live in.

After the third season began airing, casting for the fourth and fifth seasons opened on April 12, 2021. The initial members of the cast were revealed on April 27, 2022.

Players 

The season consisted of 13 players. Various members of the first set of nine players were teased alongside a trailer release on April 27, 2022. An official cast reveal took place the following day. These players included two catfishes and five players participating as themselves. Additionally, extra players were revealed as the season progressed. The first celebrity contestants, Emma Bunton & Mel B from Spice Girls, competed to help increase the prize money, however they did not partake in ratings and were not competing to win. Other additional cast members included one catfish and two players playing as themselves, two of these players were revealed with the rest of the cast but joined The Circle later. Additionally, Trevor St. Agathe, who was the catfish profile of season two winner DeLeesa St. Agathe, participated in this season.

Episodes

Results and elimination 
 Color key
 The contestant was blocked.
 The contestant was an influencer.
 The contestant was immune from being blocked.

Notes 
 : After the ratings were revealed, Frank was told that he would have to choose a new player to join the Circle the next day, being shown two profiles, "Jared" and "Trey". The new player was revealed to be played by Emma & Melanie at the end of the first episode. Due to being a new player, Jared could not be blocked during the first blocking.
 : Emma and Melanie were revealed to be taking part for a limited time, with the mission to stay undetected during that period in order to increase the winner's prize.
 : The players were tasked with voting for who they think which profile Emma and Melanie are behind. Since a majority of the players did not vote for Jared, the winner's prize was increased.
 : Due to the Cyber Attack, all players except Eversen & Trevor/Imani were vulnerable to be blocked. They had to choose who to save, and they chose Frank. This process then continued with the player who received the Antivirus most recently choosing the next person until one person was left without it, and therefore blocked. Bru, who had the final choice, chose to give the Antivirus to John/Carol, leaving Alyssa blocked.
 : Before deciding who to block, Frank and Yu Ling had a chance to save two players each. Frank chose Rachel and Imani, while Yu Ling chose Bru and Alex/Nathan. The two remaining players at risk of being blocked, Everson and John/Carol, went to the Meet Room to await the influencers' decision.
 : The ratings were not published. The lowest-rated player was immediately blocked. Meanwhile, the highest-rated player automatically became the "Superinfluencer," who could make the sole decision on whom to block.
 : The players made their final ratings.

Reception 
Since the season premiered, it kept in Netflix's "Top 10 TV Series in the U.S." list, and kept in the top for its entire run. The series landed at number six on the list for its second week on air, for its third, the series landed at number three, and for its last the series ranked at number ten.
However, the season received criticism for its casting of big personalities. Many fans were upset at the fact that most of the players were social media personalities and not "real people".

References 

2022 American television seasons
The Circle (franchise)